Morelos is one of 125 municipalities in the State of Mexico in Mexico. The municipal seat is the town of San Bartolo Morelos which is the fifth largest town in the municipality. The municipality covers an area of  222.76 km².

As of 2005, the municipality had a total population of 26,430.

References

Municipalities of the State of Mexico
Populated places in the State of Mexico